Statistics of Emperor's Cup in the 1968 season. The cup was held between December 25, 1968 and January 1, 1969.

Overview
It was contested by 8 teams, and Yanmar Diesel won the championship.

Results

Quarterfinals
Toyo Industries 0–2 Waseda University
Mitsubishi Motors 5–0 Kansai University
Yanmar Diesel 6–0 Rikkyo University
Yawata Steel 1–0 Tokyo University of Education

Semifinals
Waseda University 3–4 Mitsubishi Motors
Yanmar Diesel 3–1 Yawata Steel

Final
 
Mitsubishi Motors 0–1 Yanmar Diesel
Yanmar Diesel won the championship.

References
 NHK

Emperor's Cup
Emperor's Cup
1969 in Japanese football